The Unadilla River is a  river in the Central New York Region of New York State. The river begins northeast of the hamlet of Millers Mills and flows generally south to the village of Sidney, where it converges with the Susquehanna River, which drains into the Chesapeake Bay, a bay of the Atlantic Ocean.

Most of the length of the Unadilla forms the western border of Otsego County and the eastern borders of Chenango and Madison counties, all in New York. This border made up a significant portion of the Fort Stanwix Treaty Line of 1768. It was meant to establish the border for an Indian reserve, beyond which European-American settlers were not supposed to go. Settlers resented British efforts to control their movements, and continued to encroach on Native American territories.

Branches
The Unadilla has two branches which join at Unadilla Forks on the Otsego-Madison County border.

The main branch of the Unadilla, referred to as the Unadilla River, starts northeast of the hamlet of Millers Mills in southwestern Herkimer County.
The West Branch Unadilla River starts a few miles north of Bridgewater in southeast Oneida County. This branch was known as Eghwagy Creek during the early 18th century.

Tributaries
The Unadilla's tributaries, from north to south, include:
 Campbell Brook: from the east, near the Skaneateles Turnpike north of Leonardsville
Button Creek: from the west, between Leonardsville and West Edmeston
 Beaver Creek: from the west, between South Brookfield and Columbus Quarter
 Tallette Creek: from the west, near Columbus Quarter
Center Brook: from the west, at New Berlin
Wharton Creek: from the east, at New Berlin
Butternut Creek: from the east, near Mount Upton
Guilford Creek: from the west, north of Sidney

Alternate names and spellings
Unadilla has had various spellings and alternate names, particularly in the 18th century:
Che-on-a-dill-ha: Oneida dialect
Teyonadelhouogh: Gideon Hawley, Journey to Broome County, Oquaga (Onaheghgwage), 1753
Tiona-derha: Guy Johnson's 1768 map
Tienaderha: Guy Johnson's 1771 map and Southeir's 1779 map
Tianaderaha: Surveyor-General, Simeon De Witt's map 
Tianaderha: Fort Stanwix Treaty of 1768
Tunadilla: Common spelling 18th century correspondence
Susquehannock: Vaughan's 18th century Chorographical Map

See also
List of New York rivers

References

History of Chenango County, Ch. 7.
Francis W. Halsey, The Old New York Frontier, 1901

External links
Upper Unadilla Valley Association

Tributaries of the Susquehanna River
Rivers of New York (state)
Rivers of Otsego County, New York
Rivers of Chenango County, New York
Rivers of Madison County, New York
Rivers of Oneida County, New York
Rivers of Delaware County, New York
Rivers of Herkimer County, New York